The William O'Neill Athletic and Convocation Center (O'Neill Center) is an  multi-purpose athletic complex, at Western Connecticut State University, in Danbury, Connecticut.

Named after William O'Neill, the O'Neill Center was completed in 1995 and has since been home to WestConn's basketball and volleyball teams.

The 4,500-seat arena can also be used for concerts, shows, and other public events.

Bob Dylan kicked off his Paradise Lost Tour at the arena on December 7, 1995.

Main facilities
The O'Neill Center is home to the athletics offices, a weight room, a swimming pool, and the Feldman Arena where games are played.

External links
  http://www.wcsu.edu/campustour/westside/oc.asp# O'Neill Center main page.

Sports venues in Fairfield County, Connecticut
Sports complexes in the United States
Buildings and structures in Danbury, Connecticut
Tourist attractions in Danbury, Connecticut